Nowe Czaple may refer to the following places:
Nowe Czaple, Kuyavian-Pomeranian Voivodeship (north-central Poland)
Nowe Czaple, Lubusz Voivodeship (west Poland)
Nowe Czaple, Pomeranian Voivodeship (north Poland)